The Merrie Monarch Festival is a week-long cultural festival that takes place annually in Hilo, Hawaii during the week after Easter.  It honors King David Kalākaua, who was called the "Merrie Monarch" for his patronage of the arts and is credited with restoring many Hawaiian cultural traditions during his reign, including hula. Many hālau hula (schools), including some from the U.S. mainland and some international performers, attend the festival each year to participate in exhibitions and competitions. The festival has received worldwide attention and is considered the most prestigious of all hula contests.

Merrie Monarch week begins Easter Sunday every year. The competitive hula events end the week, and occur on Thursday, Friday, and Saturday; they are televised and live-streamed online by KHII-TV (formerly KFVE/K5).

The 2020 Merrie Monarch festival was cancelled due to coronavirus pandemic concerns.

The 2021 competition was held June 24–26, without a live audience, and was broadcast July 1–3 on KFVE.

History 
The festival is dedicated to the memory of King David Kalākaua, the last king of the Kingdom of Hawaii, who reigned from 1874 until his death in 1891. Kalākaua was “a patron of the arts, especially music and dance,” and is credited with reviving many endangered native Hawaiian traditions such as mythology, medicine, and chant. He was also a strong supporter of the hula, a traditional form of dance. Many of these cultural practices "had been suppressed for many years under missionary teachings." The festival is named after Kalākaua's nickname “Merrie Monarch” because he was known to always be happy, fun, and loving towards his people. The structure of the festival takes after Kalākaua's Silver Jubilee. This was a two-week celebration of Hawaiian culture on his 50th birthday (1886) at ʻIolani Palace on the island of Oʻahu.

The Merrie Monarch Festival began in 1963 when Helene Hale, then Executive Officer of Hawaii County, decided to create an event to increase tourism to the Island of Hawaii. The island had suffered from economic problems after the collapse of the sugar industry, and it was hoped that a festival would boost the depressed economy. Along with George Naʻope and Gene Wilhelm, Hale organized the first Merrie Monarch Festival in 1964. This festival “consisted of a King Kalākaua beard look–alike contest, a barbershop quartet contest, a relay race, a re–creation of King Kalākaua's coronation, and a Holoku Ball among other events.”

George Naʻope was a well known Kumu Hula (teacher of Hawaiian dance) throughout the whole world. He studied hula from his great grandmother since he was three years old and established his own hula school, the George Naʻope Hula School, shortly after graduating high school. He taught hula in Japan, Guam, Australia, Germany, England, and both North and South America. His purpose in life was to preserve the Hawaiian culture, and he thought the festival was a perfect way of allowing the culture live on.

By 1968, the festival had waned in popularity. Dottie Thompson took over the festival as executive director, and transformed it into a private community organization. Thompson “wanted to move the festival more toward a Hawaiian theme,” a goal that was accomplished by centering the festival events around hula. In 1971 Thompson and Na’ope introduced a hula competition. Nine wahine (female) hālau entered the competition in its first year, and in 1976 the festival opened the competition to kāne (male) hālau.

Today, the Merrie Monarch Festival is an annual week–long event culminating in three days of prestigious hula competition. It is now a non–profit organization registered with the State of Hawaii Department of Commerce and Consumer Affairs. Proceeds from the festival support educational scholarships, workshops, seminars, symposiums and the continuation of the event itself.

Festival activities
The Merrie Monarch Festival occurs annually in the spring. It runs from Easter Sunday morning to Saturday evening.

The Royal Court
For the festival, a Royal Court is created to represent King David Kalākaua  and Queen Kapiʻolani and their family. The Royal Court is coordinated by Uʻilani Peralto and Luana Kawelu, who each year search for a male and female to portray the king and queen. Peralto says, “the selection committee looks to find two individuals who exemplify maturity, humility, and pride in the Hawaiian culture.” The court consists of 22 members total, typically represented by the friends and family of the chosen king and queen. The rest of the royal court includes a counselor, kahu (caretaker), ladies-in-waiting, kahili bearers, chanters, and pu kane (conch shell blowers). Each person in the royal court is educated about their roles and Kalākaua's mission. These people who make up the Royal Court represent more than just Hawaiian history, but the Hawaiian spirit that continuously flows throughout the islands. The procession of the Royal Court precedes and ends each night of the Merrie Monarch hula competition, and they sit in state during the performances.

Non-competition events

The first four days of the festival consist of free, non–competition events. These include performances by local and international halau at many venues around Hilo, as well as an arts and crafts fair. The Wednesday Ho'ike Night Free exhibition is very popular, and often features international hālau from other Pacific islands and Japan, and native or indigenous dancers and dances from locations such as Alaska and New Zealand. A final non–competition event, the Merrie Monarch Parade, takes place on Saturday morning.

Hula competition

The festivities culminate in the annual competitions held at the Edith Kanakaʻole Multipurpose Stadium in Hoʻolulu Park. Dancers perform individually and in groups, with seven minutes allowed for each performance.

Miss Aloha Hula
Thursday night is the first competition event. Individual female dancers compete for the title of Miss Aloha Hula. Dancers perform in both modern (hula ʻauana) and traditional (hula kahiko) forms of hula, as well as chant (oli).

Miss Aloha Hula is hula's top solo wahine, or women's, honor. Originally known as Miss Hula, the title was later changed to Miss Aloha Hula. Aloha Dalire, a kumu hula and hula dancer, won the first Miss Aloha Hula under her maiden name, Aloha Wong, in 1971.

The Miss Aloha Hula competition began in 1971. Each hālau may submit one contestant who is 18 to 25 years old and unmarried. Each contestant performs a hula kahiko and hula 'auana. For kahiko, they must perform an oli, ka'i, mele, and ho'i in the 7 minute time limit. No microphones are used for the oli and minimal makeup is applied. They are also judged on their costuming and leis.

Group hula kahiko

There are two divisions of group competition, the male (kāne) division and the female (wahine) division. 
Friday night features hālau performing ancient style hula.

Group hula ʻauana

Saturday night features hālau performing modern style hula. Awards are also announced on Saturday night.

Judging criteria

During their performances hālau and individuals are judged in a variety of categories. First, there is the entrance (kaʻi). During their chant (oli) and dance (hula), judges look for interpretation of the song being performed, expression of the hula, chant, or song, posture, precision, hand gestures, feet and body movement, grooming, and authenticity of costume and adornments. Finally there is the exit off stage (hoʻi). Performers are scored on each aspect of the performance.

Cultural impact
Many believe that the Merrie Monarch Festival “brought about a renaissance of Hawaiian culture.” The festival identifies four goals related to Hawaiian culture: “1) Perpetuating the traditional culture of the Hawaiian people; 2) Developing and augmenting a living knowledge of Hawaiian arts and crafts through workshops, demonstrations, exhibitions and performances of the highest quality and authenticity; 3) Reaching those who might not otherwise have the opportunity to participate; and, 4) Enriching the future lives of all of Hawaii's children,” and claims that through the festival “thousands of people in Hawaii and throughout the world are learning about the history and culture of Hawaii.” 
The Merrie Monarch Festival “has received worldwide recognition for its historic and cultural significance.”

Television coverage

The festival was first broadcast on local TV in 1981, when KITV brought the festival to homes across Hawaii. Coverage began as taped and edited highlight segments and eventually went live.  KITV broadcast the festival for 29 years; in 2009, Luana Kawelu, who had recently taken over the job of president of the Merrie Monarch Festival, signed a deal with competitor KFVE to broadcast the festival in 2010 and beyond.

Nā Hiwahiwa O Hawai'i festival, Japan 
For some hālau, the festival does not end after the competition is over. Those who place in the competition are then invited to attend the Nā Hiwahiwa Festival in Tokyo, Japan. This festival includes Merrie Monarch Festival winners and Nā Hōku Hanohano winners. This festival is a celebration of the Hawaiian dancers and singers who received award-winning recognition in these competitions. Japan is one of the biggest supporters in the world of hula and the Hawaiian culture. Japanese hula schools do not compete in the Merrie Monarch Festival, but most of the schools travel to Hilo every year to support the hula hālau and experience the festivities Merrie Monarch has to offer.

Participants, winners, and judges

Miss Aloha Hula
Key:

 1st Place
 2nd Place
 3rd Place
 4th Place
 5th Place

1970s

1980s

1990s

2000s

2010s

2020s

Notes:
 * denotes Winner of the Hawaiian Language Award

Hālau
Hālau may participate in the Wahine or Kāne divisions, or both. For each division, they must perform a group kahiko and 'auana.

Color key

#  = Nth Place Wahine 
#  = Nth Place Kāne 
O = Overall
K = Kahiko
A = 'Auana
M = Miss Aloha Hula
	

Notes:
 * denotes Former Miss Aloha Hula Winner
 ** denotes a tie

Judges

See also
 Molokai Ka Hula Piko

References

External links 

Merrie Monarch Festival official site
Merrie Monarch Festival photographs
Merrie Monarch Festival on KFVE live stream, news, and video clips
Merrie Monarch Festival statistics and information

Cultural festivals in Hawaii
Festivals in Hawaii
Tourist attractions in Hawaii County, Hawaii
Polynesian festivals
Dance festivals in the United States
Recurring events established in 1964
Hilo, Hawaii
1964 establishments in Hawaii
Dance in Hawaii
Music festivals established in 1964
Native American festivals
Folk festivals in the United States
Annual television shows
Hula